Stória, stória...  is the second album by the Cape Verdean musician Mayra Andrade, released in 2009.

Track listing

  "Stória, stória…" (Mayra Andrade)
  "Tchápu na bandera" (Djoy Amado)
  "Seu" (Mayra Andrade)
  "Juána" (Kaka Barboza)
  "Konsiénsia" (Mayra Andrade)
  "Odjus fitchádu" (lyrics: Mayra Andrade; music: Idan Raichel)
  "Nha Damáxa" (Kim Alves)
  "Mon carrousel" (lyrics: Mayra Andrade, Fabien Pisani; music: Mayra Andrade, Celina da Piedade)	
  "Badiu si…" (Kim Alves)
  "Morena, menina linda" (Grecco Buratto)
  "Palavra" (Mario Lucio Souza)
  "Turbulénsa" (Nitu Lima)
  "Lembránsa" (Betu)

Reception
The album won the Preis der Deutschen Schallplattenkritik in the World Music category.

References

External links
[ Stória, stória...] at Allmusic
Discography section on Mayra Andrade's official web site

2009 albums
Mayra Andrade albums